Felix Samoilovich Lembersky (November 11, 1913 – December 2, 1970) was a Ukrainian/Soviet painter, artist, teacher, theater stage designer and an organizer of artistic groups. His 'Execution. Babi Yar' series (1944–52) are the earliest known artistic renderings of the Nazi massacres of Jews in Kiev.

Biography 
Lembersky was born in 1913 into the family of Samuil Lembersky of Lublin, on the eve of World War I. The Russians lost Lublin to Austro-Hungarian army in 1915. The family relocated to Berdyczów (now Berdychiv, Ukraine). However, following the Polish-Soviet War of 1919-1920, in which the city was heavily damaged by Soviet troops, Berdyczów was ceded by Poland to the USSR in 1921 according to the Peace of Riga. His parents remained there. In 1928 Lembersky relocated to Kiev where in 1928–29 he attended the Jewish Arts' and Trades' School (known as "Kultur-Lige Art School", studio of Mark Epshtein). In 1930–33 he worked as set designer for the Jewish Theater in Kiev and Berdichev and in 1933–35 attended the Kiev Art Institute, studying painting with professor Pavel Volokidin. In 1935 he moved to Leningrad to study at the Russian Academy of Arts.

Lembersky toured the Urals to collect material for his thesis, while the Soviet Union invaded Poland. He was in Berdichev when Nazi Germany launched Operation Barbarossa against the Soviet Union on June 22, 1941. As a student of the Academy, he was ordered to immediately return to Leningrad, while his parents remained in Berdichev, where they perished in the Holocaust. Writer Vasily Grossman, whom Lembersky knew from childhood in Berdichev and whose family also perished in the city, collected documents and described the massacre of Berdichev in a detailed essay published the Black Book. In July 1941, Lembersky was wounded during the defense operations at the outskirts of Leningrad. He contracted typhoid and was brought back to the Academy, which was converted into a home and a hospital for its students, professors and staff during the war. Lembersky remained there during the first months of the Siege of Leningrad. He completed his thesis during the Siege and defended it in December 1941, earning a degree in easel painting with honors for academic achievement.

1944  	Joins the Union of Soviet Artists. Offers private art classes at his studio
1944–54 Works on commissions and portraits of workers, and heads group projects. Creates Execution: Babi Yar series.
1955 	Creates triptych Leaders and Children for Anichkov Palace.
1956–57 Novgorod and Pskov series.
1958 	The Urals Series 1959–64. Railway Pointer and Miners series and Staraya Ladoga series.
1960 	Personal exhibition at LOSSKh exhibition gallery in Leningrad.
1950s–’60s Lembersky speaks out for greater freedom in Soviet art. Organizes unofficial exhibitions of young artists.
1970 	Dies December 2 at his home in Leningrad.

Career 
After the war, Lembersky entered the Leningrad Union of Artists (LOSKh, LOSSKh). He exhibited in national and privately organized art shows in Russia and his work was acquired by museums and private collectors. While living in Leningrad, he toured and worked in the Urals, Ladoga, Pskov and Baltic Republics. Much of his art was inspired by the Eastern Europe of his childhood—Ukraine and the Soviet Union.  Among his most moving images are the portraits of fellow citizens and the places where he lived and visited.

Lembersky's art is rooted in the early Soviet Avant-Garde, with which he became acquainted at Kultur-Lige and while working as a theater sets designer in Kiev in the 1920s and early 1930s. He was further exposed to Avant-Garde at the Kiev Art Institute, where Kazimir Malevich and Vladimir Tatlin taught in the years prior to the ban of Avant-Garde in 1932; and their influence continued at the Institute into the 1930s, when Lembersky studied there. In Leningrad Lembersky visited the studios of the great Avant-Garde painter and theorist Pavel Filonov and a former member of the Knave of Diamonds, artist Aleksandr Osmerkin. At the Academy of Art, Lembersky attended art history lectures given by the Avant-Garde theorist Nikolay Punin.

Lembersky's art was also formed by his classical education at the Academy, where he learned realist and impressionist techniques at the studio of Russian painter Boris Loganson. Lembersky was highly regarded for his work. During enforced Socialist Realism and despite state-imposed restrictions on Western art, Lembersky continued to add many influences to his work, including German Expressionism, the French school, Mexican mural painting, Russian icons, African folk art, and Dutch and early Renaissance painting, among others.  He was interested in modernist and contemporary literature, poetry, and theater. Music was essential to his art, he regularly attended concerts of classical music and personally knew many musicians, including Dmitri Shostakovich and conductor Natan Rakhlin, whose portrait he created in the Urals in 1943–44. He studied Western philosophy and mysticism. 
Lembersky's work is spiritual in defiance to atheism endorsed by the Soviet Union. His art is centered on the idea of a two-tiered reality, expressed in painting as a union between recognizable objects and hidden symbols shown "between the lines." He frequently included religious symbols in his paintings.

Lembersky was haunted by the memory of Holocaust. His 'Execution. Babi Yar' series (1944–52) are the earliest known artistic renderings of the Nazi massacres in Kiev. In his later work, he persistently brought back Holocaust symbols to his semi-abstract canvases. The themes of war and industrial labor—as alternating forces of destruction and reconstruction—appear again and again in his work. Yet, in contrast to the gravity of the content, Lembersky's paintings appeal to his viewers with brilliant color, light and formal beauty. His art speaks to the universal experience evoking emotional response and delighting the eye.

Publications 

Selected Bibliography:
2013
 Joel Berkowitz. Felix Lembersky: Soviet Forms, Jewish Content. Milwaukee: University of Wisconsin- Milwaukee, * Sam & Helen Stahl Center for Jewish Studies, 2013; catalogue
 Review. Russian Art and Culture (London, 2013
 Review. Financial Times (London, 2013
 Interview. BBC (Interview, London, 2013
 Review. Milwaukee Sentinel, 2013
 Julia Alcamo. Review. Jewish Quarterly (2013)

2012
Joseph Troncale, Alison Hilton, Galina Lembersky and Lourdes Figueroa. Torn From Darkness: Works by Felix Lembersky. Richmond: The University of Richmond Museums, 2012; catalogue 
 
2011
 Christian Wade. Boston University Today (2011)
 Ori Z Soltes. Arty Semite, Forward (2011)
 ChaeRan Freeze. “Unearthed.” Tablet Magazine, March 10, 2011
 Leah Burrows. “A Jewish Artist’s Untold Story.” The Jewish Advocate, March 4, 2011
 Ori Z Soltes. “Felix Lembersky: The Artist Uncovered.” Ars Judaica, vol. 7, 2011
 Eric Herschthal. “Babi Yar and the Rose Art Museum: Things Worth Seeing.” The Jewish Week, March 1, 2011
 Jason Blanchard, Robert Goodwin, and Yelena Lembersky. Felix Lembersky in Color, web-film created for Faces of Babi Yar in Felix Lembersky's Art: Presence and Absence, symposium at The Rose Art Museum, Brandeis University, March 2011, published on YouTube and Vimeo

2010
 Musya Glants. “Felix Lembersky.” Book Review. The Russian Review, July 2010
 Irina Karasik. “Felix Lembersky.” Book Review. DI (‘Dialog Iskusstv’), March 2010

2009
 Alison Hilton, Yelena Lembersky. Felix Lembersky 1913–70. Paintings and Drawings. Moscow: Galart, 2009 (bilingual catalogue in English and Russian, full color, 154 pages)
 “Felix Lembersky.” Book Review. ARLIS Art Libraries Society of North America, 2009
 Mikhail Krutikov. “Felix Lembersky.” Book Review. Forvert,  August 7, 2009
 Larisa Smirnikh, Elena Ilyina. Felix Lembersky: Tvortsi Uzniki Sovesti. Nizhny Tagil: Nizhny Tagil Museum of Fine Art, 2009

2007
 Nasedkina, A. A. “Project ‘Felix (Falik) Samuilovich Lembersky 1913–1970’: Restoration as the Rebirth of Art; Restoration of Painting of the Sixteenth to Twentieth Centuries from the Collection of the Nizhny Tagil State Museum of Fine Art.” Nizhny Tagil: State Museum of Fine Arts, 2007, 72–75. Catalog

2004
 Ilyina, Y., and L. Smirnikh, “Felix Lembersky and Tagil Periods in His Art.” Gornozavodskoi Ural, Nizhny Tagil, 2004, 75–92
 Ilyina, Y, L. Smirnikh, and M. Ageeva, Painting of the First Half of the Twentieth Century from the Collection of the Nizhny Tagil State Museum of Fine Arts. Nizhny Tagil: State Museum of Fine Arts, 2004, 91

2003
 Musya Glants.  “Jewish Artists in Russian Art: Painting and Sculpture in the Soviet and Post-Soviet Eras.” Published in Jewish Life after the USSR, edited by Zvi Gittleman with Musya Glants and Marshall I. Goldman. Bloomington & Indianapolis: Indiana University Press, 2003
 Olga Litvak Painting and Sculpture. The YIVO Encyclopedia of Jews in Eastern Europe

1990s
 Soltes, Ori Z., Felix Lembersky. New York: Hillwood Art Museum, Long Island University, Brookville, 1999

1980s
 Jewish News, Detroit, Michigan, USA, July 15, 1988
 Jewish News, Detroit, Michigan, USA, May 19, 1989

1970s
Leon Shapiro,  “Easter Europe: Soviet Union: Today and A Look Back.” American Jewish Year Book, 1973
 Zisman, Iosif. “The Life of Felix Lembersky.” Sovetish Heimland, Moscow, 1972
 “Falik Lembersky” in “Essays about Artists.” ZTYME, Krajowa. December 13, 1969

1960s
 “Felix Lembersky.” Sovetish Heimland, Moscow, 1969. Color insert
 “Sovetske vytvarne umеni (Avant-garde traditions in Soviet art).” Sovetskoe Iskusstvo. Trutnov: OV SCSP, Czechoslovakia, 1961
 Kornilov, P. Felix Lembersky. Leningrad: Leningradskoe Otdelenie Souza Sovetskikh Khudozhnikov RSFSR, 1960. Catalog

1950s
 “Decade of the Arts in the Urals.” In Marietta Shaginyan: A Collection of Essays in Six Volumes. Volume 6, “About Art and Literature.” Moscow: Gosudarstvennoe Izdatelstvo Khudozhestvennoi Literaturi, 1958, 417–29

1940s
 “Decade of the Arts in the Urals.” Homefront in the Urals: A Writer's Diary. 1944, 125–26
 Trud, Urals Almanach, 1943–44
 Berezark, I. “Exhibition of Tagil Artists.” Tagilskiy Rabochiy, Nizhny Tagil, May 29, 1943
 Davidov, A. Soviet Landscape. Moscow: Iskusstvo, 1958.“Decade of the Arts in the Urals.” Izvestiya, October 24, 1942
 Lembersky, Felix. “Let’s Organize a Union of Soviet Artists in Nizhny Tagil.” Tagilskiy Rabochiy, Nizhny Tagil, July 28, 1942
 “Tagil Artists at Work.” Tagilskiy Rabochiy, Nizhny Tagil, September 13, 1942
 Shaginyan, Marietta. “Decade of the Arts in the Urals.” Literatura I Iskusstvo, November 30, 1942
 “The Art in the Urals Today.” Literatura I Iskusstvo, December 19, 1942
 “The Work of Tagil Artists.” Tagilskiy Rabochiy, Nizhny Tagil, November 7, 1942
 Zimenko, V. M., et al. Visual Art during the Great Patriotic War. Moscow: Akademia Khudozhestv SSSR, 1951, 157–58

1930s
 “Proletarskaya Pravda,” Globus, 1933

References

External links 
 lembersky.org
 
 vimeo.com/21099061
 vimeo.com/21097879
 Felix Lembersky's exhibit at Boston University Rubin Frankel Gallery, Sept 1 – Dec 21, 2011
 

1913 births
1970 deaths
Artists from Lublin
Artists from Kyiv
Jews from the Russian Empire
Ukrainian Jews
Soviet Jews
Jewish painters
Soviet painters
Modern painters
Repin Institute of Arts alumni
20th-century Russian painters
People from the Russian Empire of Polish descent
Painters from the Russian Empire
Russian male painters
Russian avant-garde
Ukrainian avant-garde
Painters from Saint Petersburg
Theatre people from Kyiv
Russian people of Polish-Jewish descent
Russian Jews
20th-century Russian male artists